Luciano Álvarez (born 30 November 1978) is an Argentine former football striker who last played for Sportivo Dock Sud in the Argentine Primera C Metropolitana.

Álvarez is a typical example of the South American international journeyman footballer. He has played for seven teams in seven countries. He started his career at Independiente in 1999.

In 2001 Álvarez moved to Italy to try his luck with Savona but he soon moved on to Finland to play for Inter Turku between 2001 and 2004.

In 2005, he spent a while in Spain with Segunda División B side CD Linares. Later that year he moved to England to play with Yeovil Town F.C. in the fourth tier of English football. He scored his first and only goal for Yeovil against Chesterfield. Halfway through the 2005–06 season Álvarez was released by Yeovil, he then found himself in Guatemala playing for Comunicaciones and he now plays for Coquimbo Unido in Chile.

In 2007 Álvarez returned to Argentina to sign for Instituto de Córdoba of the Argentine 2nd division.

In 2008 when Álvarez was on trial at Swedish club Degerfors IF, he injured his foot badly in a friendly-game against Ljungskile.

References

External links
Interview with Ciderspace.

1978 births
Living people
Sportspeople from Lanús
Argentine footballers
Argentine expatriate footballers
Association football forwards
Argentine people of Spanish descent
Instituto footballers
CD Linares players
Yeovil Town F.C. players
FC Inter Turku players
Veikkausliiga players
Coquimbo Unido footballers
Savona F.B.C. players
Segunda División B players
Expatriate footballers in Chile
Expatriate footballers in Peru
Expatriate footballers in Spain
Expatriate footballers in Finland
Expatriate footballers in England
Expatriate footballers in Guatemala
Expatriate footballers in Italy